A haltija (haltia) is a spirit, gnome, or elf-like creature in Finnish mythology that guards, helps, or protects something or somebody. The word is possibly derived from the Gothic haltijar, which referred to the original settler of a homestead—although this is not the only possible etymology. It can also be derived from the Finnish verb hallita, which means 'to rule', 'to command', 'to master'.

The word is also used in modern Finnish to mean, depending on the context, holder, occupant, lord, master, owner-occupier, occupier, possessor, bearer, or owner.

There are many different kinds of haltijas. There are, for example water haltijas and forest haltijas. Even graveyards have their own haltijas (kalman väki, "death folk").

Human settlements also have haltijas. One type is the tonttu or maan haltija (land haltija). The tonttu is the Finnish version of the Swedish tomte. The Finnish tonttu and the Swedish tomte are related to the words tontti (Finnish) and tomt (Swedish), which both mean building lot and building site. (Later, such local spirits are also referred to as a tomtegubbe ["old man of the homestead"] in Swedish). The kotihaltija (home elf, home gnome) is the tonttu who lives in every home. He takes care of the house, and it is important to treat him with respect. The saunatonttu lives in the sauna and protects it but also makes sure that people do not behave improperly in it. Joulutonttu is Finnish for Christmas elf. Unlike the Christmas elves in some countries, the Finnish joulutonttu doesn't have pointy ears.

There are even personal haltijas, which are protective spirits that are part of the plural human soul in Finno-Ugric animism. Haltijas are not like Christian angels, but have some resemblances to other  spirit guide type forces found in indigenous folklore worldwide.

In Estonian mythology a similar being is called haldjas, whereas the term used in Estonian for a holder, master, or owner-occupier is haldaja.

Haltija is sometimes written as haltia. Nowadays this more old-fashioned spelling often refers to the elves in Tolkien's books or other fantasy literature.

Folk and power
Some haltijas are divided into races or folks, which are called väki. Väki is a polysemic term, and has been used in multiple conflicting meanings, and assigning only one definition to it is not consistent with the source material. Väki means either "strength/power" or "group/corps (of people)" (e.g.  väkiviina "strong liquor" vs. sotaväki "the military"), of which the meaning of "power" is etymologically older. The meaning of väki meaning "folk" is the result of the anthropomorphication of abstract concepts like "kalman väki", the power of dead spirits. It does not constitute a separate supernatural force like mana, but is a generic concept for "potency" or "power", including and not separately distinguishing magical potency. There are different kind of väkis of haltijas, like veden väki (water folk) or metsän väki (forest folk). In this context, the word väki can refer to them as a folk, their magical powers, or usually both at the same time. For example, if someone gets sick while swimming, this could be caused by väki of water that become attached to a person. In this sense väki is more like a magical power emanating from water that can make people ill, but it can also mean that haltijas (spirits) are attached to a person. In comparison, if someone goes fishing, they can ask for väki of water to bring fish by calling individual haltijas belonging to that väki by their names, wherein väki is understood more as a folk.

Some väkis of haltijas:
Väki of forest (metsän väki) means haltijas of forest. Their leader is Tapio, the king of the forest. It also means magical powers of the forest.
Väki of water (veden väki) means haltijas of water. Their leader is Ahti, the king of the sea. Veden väki is also the magical power of water that can make people sick or heal them.
Väki of woman (naisen väki) is usually understood as special magical powers of women.
Väki of death (kalman väki) means ghosts and spirits, but also the magical power that can be found in a graveyard. This power can make people ill and it can also be used against other people.
Väki of fire: (tulen väki) means spirits of fire, but also the destructive forces of fire and healing power of warm air, for example in a sauna.
Väki of mountain (vuoren väki) usually means the haltijas of hills and big stones.
Väki of wood (puun väki) means the race of haltijas of trees, and also the power of wooden material, which can cause pain if you are hit by a wooden object.
Väki of iron (raudan väki) means haltijas of iron. They can hurt people who are hit by bladed weapons. Väki of iron can also be commanded to heal the wounds they have given.

Haltija väkis of different environments and materials were thought to be in conflict with each other. For example, when wood is burned, it is an assault in which väki of fire is beating väki of wood. Väki of fire can be used to scare other väki away. For example, if you were made ill by väki of water, that attached to you while you were swimming, this väki and the illness could be removed in sauna, which had many väki of fire.

See also
 
 Brownie (Scotland and England)
 Domovoi (Slavic)
 Dwarf
 Elf
 Gnome
 Kikimora
 Kobold
 Lares (Roman)
 Satyr (Greek)
 Sprite
 Tomte (Swedish)
 Vættir and Landvættir (Norse and Germanic)

References

Elves
Fairies
Finnish legendary creatures
Tutelary deities
Estonian legendary creatures
Nature spirits